KLCZ (88.9 FM) is a public radio broadcasting a news/talk format, simulcasting KBSX 91.5 FM Boise.  KLCZ has sampled from a variety of often very different genres recently.  Licensed to Lewiston, Idaho, United States, the radio station serves the Lewiston area.  The station is currently owned by Lewis–Clark State College.

History
On February 1, 2007, the station changed its call sign to the current KLCZ.

In October 2022 KLCZ switched from freeform college radio (which continues online-only) to a simulcast of Boise State Public Radio's news/talk-formatted KBSX 91.5 FM Boise.

References

External links
Boise State Public Radio website
Former KLCZ college radio website
KLCZ history

LCZ
LCZ
Radio stations established in 1967